Hong Ye-eun (born July 5, 1996), known professionally as Jvcki Wai, is a South Korean rapper. In 2018, she signed to Indigo Music and released her debut studio album Enchanted Propaganda. In 2021, she won Collaboration of the Year at the Korean Hip-hop Awards with "Fadeaway".

Early life 
Hong Ye-eun was born on July 5, 1996. She wanted to be a singer-songwriter when she was young, but later became interested in hip hop. In 2013, she won Galmighty, a female rapper competition hosted by rapper Fana.

Career

2016-2019: Signing to Indigo Music 
In 2016, Jvcki Wai released her debut extended play Exposure. In 2017, she released her second extended play Neo Eve. In January 2018, she signed to Indigo Music. In July 2018, she released her debut studio album Enchanted Propaganda. In January 2019, she released single "Dding" with rappers Yang Hong-won, Osshun Gum, and Han Yo-han, which received critical acclaim. In October 2019, she departed from Indigo Music as her contract expired.

2020-present: Signing to AOMG 
In 2020, Jvcki Wai released single "Fadeaway" with Coogie, Paloalto, The Quiett, and Bassagong, which later won Collaboration of the Year at the Korean Hip-hop Awards. In 2022, she signed to AOMG.

Artistry 
Jvcki Wai garnered attention for her unique raps and songs about life as a woman. She gets inspiration from everything that happens in society.

Discography

Studio albums

Extended plays

Singles

Awards and nominations

References 

1996 births
Living people
South Korean women rappers